Sather is a surname. Notable people with the surname include:

Croix Sather (born 1970), American author, inspirational speaker and ultra-athlete
Drake Sather (1959–2004), American stand-up comedian, television writer and producer
Glen Sather (born 1943), Canadian ice hockey player
Martin Sather (born 1983), American curler and jazz musician
Michael Sather (born c. 1947), Canadian politician
Peder Sather (1810–1886), Norwegian-born American banker
Trevor Sather (born 1973), British film writer and actor
Paul Sather (born 1971), Head Men's Basketball Coach for the University of North Dakota